The 1969 World Cup took place 2–5 October at Singapore Island Country Club in Singapore. It was the 17th World Cup event. The tournament was a 72-hole stroke play team event with 45 teams. Each team consisted of two players from a country. The combined score of each team determined the team results. The American team of Orville Moody and Lee Trevino won by eight strokes over the Japan team of Takaaki Kono and Haruo Yasuda. This was the tenth victory for the United States in the history of the World Cup, until 1967 named the Canada Cup. The individual competition was won by Trevino one stroke ahead of Roberto De Vicenzo, Argentina.

Teams 

(a) denotes amateur

Scores
Team

International Trophy

Sources:

References

World Cup (men's golf)
Golf tournaments in Singapore
World Cup
World Cup